Molenda is a Polish-language surname. The word molenda used to mean miller, from  Latin molendinator.

Notable people with this surname include:
Bo Molenda (1905–1986), American football player
Leszek Molenda (1953–1999), Polish volleyball player

References

Polish-language surnames
Occupational surnames

pl:Molenda